Hobbits are a fictional race of people in the novels of J. R. R. Tolkien. About half average human height, Tolkien presented hobbits as a variety of humanity, or close relatives thereof. Occasionally known as halflings in Tolkien's writings, they live barefooted, and traditionally dwell in homely underground houses which have windows, built into the sides of hills, though others live in houses. Their feet have naturally tough leathery soles (so they do not need shoes) and are covered on top with curly hair.

Hobbits first appeared in the 1937 children's novel The Hobbit, whose titular hobbit is the protagonist Bilbo Baggins, who is thrown into an unexpected adventure involving a dragon. In its sequel, The Lord of the Rings, the hobbits Frodo Baggins, Sam Gamgee, Pippin Took, and Merry Brandybuck are primary characters who all play key roles in fighting to save their world ("Middle-earth") from evil. In The Hobbit, hobbits live together in a small town called Hobbiton, which in The Lord of the Rings is identified as being part of a larger rural region called the Shire, the homeland of the hobbits in the northwest of Middle-earth. They also live in a village east of the Shire, called Bree, where they co-exist with regular humans. Tolkien hints that there may be other hobbit settlements thereabouts, but they are never visited in the story.

The origins of the name and idea of "hobbits" have been debated; literary antecedents include Sinclair Lewis's 1922 novel Babbitt, and Edward Wyke Smith's 1927 The Marvellous Land of Snergs. There is a possible connection with old names for ghostly creatures, which include bogles, hobbits, and hobgoblins. Tolkien emphatically rejected a relationship with rabbits,  and emphasized hobbits' humanity, though later scholars have noted several lines of evidence to the contrary.

Halflings appear as a race in Dungeons & Dragons, the original name hobbits being later avoided for legal reasons. The usage has been taken up by fantasy authors including Terry Brooks, Jack Vance, and Clifford D. Simak.

Characteristics 

Tolkien describes hobbits as between two and four feet (0.6–1.2 m) tall, with the average height being . They dress in bright colours, favouring yellow and green. Nowadays (according to Tolkien's fiction), they are usually shy, but are nevertheless capable of great courage and amazing feats under the proper circumstances. They are adept at throwing stones. For the most part, they cannot grow beards, but a few Stoor hobbits can. Their feet are covered with curly hair (usually brown, as is the hair on their heads) and have leathery soles, so hobbits hardly ever wear shoes. Hobbits are not quite as stocky as the similarly sized dwarves, but still tend to be stout, with slightly pointed ears. Tolkien clarified their appearance in a 1938 letter to his American publisher:

Tolkien presented hobbits as relatives of the human race, or a "variety" or separate "branch" of humanity. In Tolkien's fictional world, hobbits and other races are aware of the similarities between humans and hobbits (hence the colloquial terms for each other of "Big People" and "Little People"); nevertheless, the hobbits consider themselves a separate people.

The race's average life expectancy is 100 years, but some of Tolkien's main hobbit characters live much longer: Bilbo Baggins and the Old Took are described as living to the age of 130 or beyond, though Bilbo's long lifespan owes much to his possession of the One Ring. Hobbits are considered to "come of age" on their 33rd birthday, so a 50-year-old hobbit would be regarded as entering middle-age.

Origins 

 
Tolkien claimed that he started The Hobbit suddenly, without premeditation, in the midst of grading a set of student essay exams in 1930 or 1931, writing its famous opening line on a blank piece of paper: "In a hole in the ground there lived a hobbit".

In English literature 

The term "hobbit", however, has real antecedents in modern English. One is a fact that Tolkien admitted: the title of Sinclair Lewis's 1922 novel Babbitt, about a "complacent American businessman" who goes through a journey of some kind of self-discovery, facing "near-disgrace"; the critic Tom Shippey observes that there are some parallels here with Bilbo's own journey.

According to a letter from Tolkien to W. H. Auden, one "probably ... unconscious" inspiration was Edward Wyke Smith's 1927 children's book The Marvellous Land of Snergs. Tolkien described the Snergs as "a race of people only slightly taller than the average table but broad in the shoulders and [who] have the strength of ten men."

Another possible origin emerged in 1977 when the Oxford English Dictionary announced that it had found the source that it supposed Tolkien to have used: James Hardy wrote in his 1895 The Denham Tracts, Volume 2: "The whole earth was overrun with ghosts, boggles ... hobbits, hobgoblins." The Tolkien scholar Tom Shippey writes that the list was of ghostly creatures without bodies, nothing like Tolkien's solid flesh-and-blood hobbits. Tolkien scholars consider it unlikely that Tolkien saw the list.

Rabbit 

An additional connection is with rabbit, one that Tolkien "emphatically rejected", although the word appears in The Hobbit in connection with other characters' opinions of Bilbo in several places. Bilbo compares himself to a rabbit when he is with the eagle that carries him; the eagle, too, tells Bilbo not to be "frightened like a rabbit". The giant bear-man Beorn teases Bilbo and jokes that "little bunny is getting nice and fat again", while the dwarf Thorin shakes Bilbo "like a rabbit".

Shippey writes that the rabbit is not a native English species, but was deliberately introduced in the 13th century, and has become accepted as a local wild animal. Shippey compares this "situation of anachronism-cum-familiarity" with the lifestyle of the hobbit, giving the example of smoking "pipeweed". He argues that Tolkien did not want to write "tobacco", as it did not arrive until the 16th century, so Tolkien invented a calque made of English words. 
Donald O'Brien, writing in Mythlore, notes, too, that Aragorn's description of Frodo's priceless mithril mail-shirt, "here's a pretty hobbit-skin to wrap an elven-princeling in", is a "curious echo" of the English nursery rhyme "To find a pretty rabbit-skin to wrap the baby bunting in."

Fictional etymology 

Tolkien has King Théoden of Rohan say "the Halflings, that some among us call the Holbytlan". Tolkien set out a fictional etymology for the word "hobbit" in an appendix to The Lord of the Rings, that it was derived from holbytla (plural holbytlan), meaning "hole-builder". This was Tolkien's own new construction from Old English hol, "a hole or hollow", and bytlan, "to build".

Types 

Tolkien devised a fictional history with three types of hobbits, with different physical characteristics and temperaments: Harfoots, Fallohides, and Stoors. By the time of Bilbo and Frodo, these kinds had intermixed for centuries, though unevenly, so that some families and regions skewed more towards descent from one of the three groups.

The Harfoots were by far the most numerous group of hobbits and were the first to enter the land of Eriador, which contains the Shire and Bree. They were the smallest in stature, "browner of skin" in complexion, and the most typical of the race as described in The Hobbit. They lived in holes, or smials, and had closer relations with Dwarves than other hobbits did. Harfoots tended to live in gentle rolling hill country, and were mostly agrarian. They were the first group to cross the Misty Mountains, settling in the lands around Bree starting in Third Age 1050 (about 2,000 years before the time of Bilbo and Frodo, and five and a half centuries before the founding of the Shire in Third Age 1601). Tolkien coined the term "Harfoot" as analogous to "hairfoot".

The Fallohides were the least numerous, and the second group to enter Eriador. They were generally fair-haired, and taller and slimmer than other hobbits. While the other two types of hobbit were on average about three and a half feet tall, Fallohides were closer on average to four feet (though still shorter than dwarves, who had an average height of four and a half feet). They were more adventurous than the other breeds and preferred living in woodlands, where they became skilled huntsmen (known for their accuracy with ranged weapons). They had closer relations with Elves (who also tended to live in forests). Due to their contact with the Elves, Fallohides were the first hobbits to learn literacy, and therefore were the only ones who preserved even vague knowledge of their past before crossing the Misty Mountains. The Fallohides crossed into Eriador about a century after the Harfoots did, and settled in the pre-existing Harfoot villages of the Bree-land. Never very numerous, the Fallohides intermixed with and were largely absorbed by the Harfoots during this time, though several prominent families such as the Tooks and the Masters of Buckland had a substantial Fallohide descent, unlike many of the people that they led. After about four centuries, a large expedition of Hobbits migrated westward from Bree-land led by the Fallohide brothers Marcho and Blancho, who settled and founded the Shire in TA 1601.

Bilbo and three of the four principal hobbit characters in The Lord of the Rings (Frodo, Pippin, and Merry) had Fallohide blood through their common ancestor, the Old Took. The one physical description given for Frodo matches this, as Gandalf identifies him as "taller than some (hobbits), and fairer than most". Tolkien created the name from the archaic meanings of English words "fallow" and "hide", meaning "pale skin".

The Stoors were the second most numerous group of hobbits and the last to enter Eriador. They were quite different from the other two groups: they were stockier than other hobbits, though slightly shorter, and they were also the only group whose males were able to grow beards. They had an affinity for water, dwelt mostly beside rivers, and were the only hobbits to use boats and swim (activities which other hobbits considered dangerous and frightening). Their hands and feet were also sturdier than those of other hobbits, who generally didn't wear shoes for cushioning their steps, though because the Stoors tended to live near muddy riverbanks they often wore boots to keep their feet dry (making them the only hobbits to use footwear of any kind). Tolkien says they were "less shy of Men". The Stoors migrated into Eriador two centuries after the Fallohides did, but instead of settling in Bree-land they headed farther south to Dunland by Third Age 1300, finally migrating to the newly founded Shire in Third Age 1630, the last of the three groups to arrive. The Stoors mostly settled along the banks of the River Brandywine in the east of the Shire, thus many hobbits of Buckland and the Marish were of Stoor descent. Due to the time the Stoors spent living in Dunland before migrating to the Shire, their names have a slight Celtic influence.

A small group of Stoors did not go as far south as Dunland but settled in the wetlands of the Angle in southern Rhudaur, between Dunland and Bree. When the evil power of Angmar rose in the north many of these Stoors joined their kin in Dunland, but some fled back east over the mountains and settled in the marshes of the Gladden Fields: Déagol and Sméagol/Gollum both belonged to this group.  Tolkien used the Old English word stor or stoor, meaning "strong".

Lifestyle and culture 

In his writings, Tolkien depicted hobbits as fond of an unadventurous, bucolic and simple life of farming, eating, and socializing, although capable of defending their homes courageously if the need arises. They would enjoy six meals a day, if they could get them. They claimed to have invented the art of smoking pipe-weed. 
They were extremely "clannish" and had strong "predilections for genealogy"; accordingly, Tolkien included several hobbit family trees in The Lord of the Rings. Most Hobbits married and had large families, although Bilbo and Frodo were exceptions to this general rule.

The hobbits of the Shire developed the custom of giving away gifts on their birthdays, instead of receiving them, although this custom was not universally followed among other hobbit cultures or communities. The term mathom is used for old and useless objects, but which hobbits are unwilling to throw away. Mathoms are invariably given as presents many times over, sometimes returning to the original owner, or are stored in a museum (mathom-house).

The hobbits had a distinct calendar: every year started on a Saturday and ended on a Friday, with each of the twelve months consisting of thirty days. Some special days did not belong to any month—Yule 1 and 2 (New Year's Eve & New Years Day) and three Lithedays in mid-summer. Every fourth year there was an extra Litheday, most likely as an adaptation, similar to a leap year, to ensure that the calendar remained in time with the seasons.

Hobbits traditionally live in "hobbit-holes", or smials, underground homes found in hillsides, downs, and banks, though others lived in houses. It has been suggested that the soil or ground of the Shire consists of loess and that this facilitates the construction of hobbit-holes. Loess is a yellow soil, which would explain the colour of the Brandywine River, and the nature of the bricks made at Stock, the main Shire brickyard. Hobbit architecture favours round doors and windows.

Tolkien likened his own tastes to those of hobbits in a 1958 letter:

Fictional history 

In their earliest folk tales, hobbits appear to have inhabited the Valley of Anduin, between Mirkwood and the Misty Mountains. According to The Lord of the Rings, they had lost the genealogical details of how they are related to the Big People. Still, Tolkien clearly states in "Concerning Hobbits" that hobbits are not technically a distinct race from Men, the way that Elves or Dwarves are, but branched off from other humans in the distant past of the Elder Days. Many eons later, but still early in the Third Age, the ancient hobbits lived in the valley of the Anduin River, close by the Éothéod, the ancestors of the Rohirrim. This led to some contact between the two, and as a result many old words and names in "Hobbitish" are derivatives of words in Rohirric (which Tolkien "translated" into his text by presenting it as Old English).

The Harfoots lived on the lowest slopes of the Misty Mountains in hobbit holes dug into the hillsides. They were not only smaller and shorter, but also beard- and bootless. The Stoors lived on the marshy Gladden Fields where the Gladden River met the Anduin, and were broader and heavier in build; and the Fallohides preferred to live in the woods under the Misty Mountains. They were described as fairer of skin and hair, as well as taller and slimmer than the rest of the hobbits.

In the Third Age, the hobbits undertook the arduous task of crossing the Misty Mountains - a migration period they refer to as the "Wandering Days", the earliest remembered time in their history. Reasons for this trek are unknown, but they possibly had to do with Sauron's growing power in nearby Greenwood, which later became known as Mirkwood as a result of the shadow that fell upon it during his search of the forest for the One Ring. The hobbits took different routes in their journey westward, but as they began to settle together in Bree-land, Dunland, and the Angle formed by the rivers Mitheithel and Bruinen, the divisions between the hobbit-kinds began to blur. Shippey explains that the name "Angle" has a special resonance, as the name "England" comes from the Angle (Anglia) between the Flensburg Fjord and the River Schlei, in the north of Germany next to Denmark, the origin of the Angles among the Anglo-Saxons who founded England. Further, the migrations of the three types of hobbit mirror those of England's founders.

In the year 1601 of the Third Age (year 1 in the Shire Reckoning), two Fallohide brothers named Marcho and Blanco gained permission from the King of Arnor at Fornost to cross the River Brandywine and settle on the other side. Many hobbits followed them, and most of the territory they had settled in the Third Age was abandoned. Only Bree and a few surrounding villages lasted to the end of the Third Age. The new land that they founded on the west bank of the Brandywine was called the Shire.

Originally the hobbits of the Shire swore nominal allegiance to the last Kings of Arnor, being required only to acknowledge their lordship, speed their messengers, and keep the bridges and roads in repair. During the final fight against Angmar at the Battle of Fornost, the hobbits maintain that they sent a company of archers to help but this is nowhere else recorded. After the battle, the kingdom of Arnor was destroyed, and in the absence of the king, the hobbits elected a Thain of the Shire from among their own chieftains.

The first Thain of the Shire was Bucca of the Marish, who founded the Oldbuck family. However, the Oldbuck family later crossed the Brandywine River to create the separate land of Buckland and the family name changed to the familiar "Brandybuck". Their patriarch then became Master of Buckland. With the departure of the Oldbucks/Brandybucks, a new family was selected to have its chieftains be Thain: the Took family (Pippin Took was son of the Thain and would later become Thain himself). The Thain was in charge of Shire Moot and Muster and the Hobbitry-in-Arms, but as the hobbits of the Shire generally led entirely peaceful, uneventful lives the office of Thain came to be seen as something of a formality.

Hobbits first appear in The Hobbit as the rural people of the Shire; the book tells of the unexpected adventure that happened to one of them, Bilbo, as a party of Dwarves seeks to recover an ancient treasure from the hoard of a dragon. They are again central to The Lord of the Rings, an altogether darker tale, where Bilbo's younger cousin Frodo sets out from the Shire to destroy the Ring that Bilbo had brought home.

Moral significance 

The Tolkien critic Paul H. Kocher notes that Tolkien's literary techniques require readers to view hobbits as like humans, especially when placed under moral pressure to survive a war that threatens to devastate their land. Frodo becomes in some ways the symbolic representation of the conscience of hobbits, a point made explicitly in the story "Leaf by Niggle" which Tolkien wrote at the same time as the first nine chapters of The Lord of the Rings. Niggle is a painter struggling against the summons of death to complete his one great canvas, a picture of a tree with a background of forest and distant mountains. He dies with the work incomplete, undone by his imperfectly generous heart: "it made him uncomfortable more often than it made him do anything". After discipline in Purgatory, however, Niggle finds himself in the very landscape depicted by his painting which he is now able to finish with the assistance of a neighbour who obstructed him during life. The picture complete, Niggle is free to journey to the distant mountains which represent the highest stage of his spiritual development. Thus, upon recovery from the wound inflicted by the Witch-King of Angmar on Weathertop, Gandalf speculates that the hobbit Frodo "may become like a glass filled with a clear light for eyes to see that can". Similarly, as Frodo nears Mount Doom he casts aside weapons and refuses to fight others with physical force: "For him struggles for the right must hereafter be waged only on the moral plane".

In popular culture

Fantasy

Dungeons & Dragons began using the name halfling as an alternative to hobbit for legal reasons. "Halfling", attested from 1808 in Scots usage, means an adolescent who is neither man nor boy, and so half of both. Fantasy authors including Terry Brooks, Jack Vance, and Clifford D. Simak use races of halflings.

The Lord of the Rings: The Rings of Power, a series screened from 2022, has attracted "fierce debate" about its handling of race, and racism aimed at the actors playing the Harfoots. The fantasy author Neil Gaiman, defending the casting, commented that "Tolkien described the Harfoots as "browner of skin" than the other hobbits. So I think anyone grumbling is either racist or hasn't read their Tolkien." Commentators have observed that the hobbit-like Harfoots speak in Irish accents, behave as friendly peasants, and are accompanied by Celtic music; and that they resemble the 19th century caricaturist John Leech's "wildly unflattering" depictions of the Irish in Punch magazine.

Popular music

The comic horror rock band Rosemary's Billygoat recorded a song and video called "Hobbit Feet", about a man who takes a girl home from a bar only to discover she has horrifying "hobbit feet". According to lead singer Mike Odd, the band received over 100 pieces of hate mail from angry Tolkien fans.

Taxonomy
A few biological taxa have been named after hobbits. The skeletal remains of several diminutive paleolithic hominids were discovered on the Indonesian island of Flores in 2004. The fossils, of a species named Homo floresiensis after the island on which the remains were found, were informally dubbed "hobbits" by their discoverers in a series of articles published in the scientific journal Nature. The excavated skeletons reveal a hominid that (like a hobbit) grew no larger than a three-year-old modern child and had proportionately larger feet than modern humans. Another such organism is Peperomia hobbitoides, a small tuberous plant of the Isthmus of Tehuantepec, Mexico. It was named for being small, "strongly and faithfully tied to this home substrate", and "under threat by forces much larger than itself"—in this case habitat destruction.

See also

 Hobbit Day

Notes

References

Primary 
This list identifies each items' locations in Tolkien's writings.

Secondary

Sources 

 
  
 
 
 
  
 
 
  
  
 
 
 
 

The Hobbit
The Lord of the Rings
Fictional human races